Madhu is a 1959 Indian Hindi-language film starring Meena Kumari and Karan Dewan in lead roles. The film is directed by Gyan Mukherjee and S. Banerjee. Its music is composed by Roshan.

Plot 
Madhu a daughter of a village Purohit and Vijay son of the Zamindar are in deep love. When Zamindar learns about this, he orders Vijay to go to Lucknow and tells the purohit to take some money and marry Madhu off to someone else immediately. Vijay escapes from the train, returns to Madhu’s house and convinces purohit to marry him to Madhu immediately, promising to change Zamindar’s mind. They get married and celebrate 'Suhag Raat', too. Then Vijay returns to Lucknow. The wicked Munim who had accompanied him to Lucknow, informs Zamindar, who rushes to Lucknow. He intercepts the letters of the newlyweds. Thus Madhu is stranded, without any news from Vijay and Vijay does not know that she is carrying his child. Zamindar fixes Vijay's marriage to another girl. Vijay rushes to his village only to find that due to social stigma of unwed motherhood, Madhu has left the town in his search. Also his friend Shambhu is in Lucknow to find him. The rest of the story takes the beaten track of a married couple missing each other, the father falling sick, Madhu nursing him to recovery, change of heart by the father and reunion of the husband and wife with a child as a bonus.

Cast 
 Meena Kumari as Madhu
 Karan Dewan as Vijay
 Kumkum
 Tun Tun
 Krishna Kant as Shambhu
 Pratima Devi
 Sheela Vaz
 Jagdish Sethi

Crew 
 Director – S. Bannerjee, Gyan Mukherjee
 Producer – Ghanshyam Das
 Story – Gyan Mukherjee
 Screenplay – Gyan Mukherjee
 Dialogues – Gyan Mukherjee
 Music – Roshan
 Lyrics – Shailendra, Prem Dhawan, Naqsh Lyallpuri
 Playback singers – Lata Mangeshkar, Mohammed Rafi, Manna Dey, Asha Bhosle

Soundtrack
The film had seven songs in it. The music of the film was composed by Roshan. Shailendra, Prem Dhawan and Naqsh Lyallpuri wrote the lyrics.

 "Kisi Ko Na Bataoongi" - Lata Mangeshkar. Lyrics by: Shailendra
 "Bata Do Koi Kaun Gali Gaye Shyam" (Male) - Manna Dey. Lyrics by: Shailendra
 "Bata Do Koi Kaun Gali Gaye Shyam" (Female) - Lata Mangeshkar. Lyrics by: Shailendra
 "Kaahe Bano Ji Anjaan	" - Lata Mangeshkar. Lyrics by: Shailendra
 "Dhaani Chunar Mori Hai" - Lata Mangeshkar. Lyrics by: Naqsh Lyallpuri
 "Tumse Lagan Laagi" - Mohammad Rafi, Lata Mangeshkar. Lyrics by: Naqsh Lyallpuri
 "O Deke Badnaami Zamane Bhar Ki" - Asha Bhosle, Mohammad Rafi. Lyrics by: Prem Dhawan

References

External links
 

1959 films
1950s Hindi-language films
Films directed by Gyan Mukherjee